Noorainee binti Abdul Rahman (Jawi: نورعيني بنت عبد الرحمن; born 21 April 1949) is the wife of Muhyiddin Yassin, who served as the 8th Prime Minister of Malaysia from March 2020 to August 2021, 10th and former Deputy Prime Minister of Malaysia from April 2009 to July 2015. She is known for the school-in-hospital project.

Marriage 
She was married to Tan Sri Muhyiddin Yassin in 1972 with whom she had 4 children, 2 sons and 2 daughters.

Family
They have four children, Datuk Fakhri Yassin Mahiaddin, (married to Datin Fara Ikma Tan Sri Haji Abdul Rahim), a corporate figure and served as Executive Chairman; Datin Sri Nabilah Mahiaddin, (Married with Dato' Sri Muhamad Adlan Berhan); Najwa Mahiaddin, (Married with Encik Idris Koh Keng Hui), a singer and Farhan Yassin Mahiaddin. Farhan is also known as Moslem Priest as his stage name.

His children are heavily involved in business and corporate, entertainment and writing industries. His son, Datuk Fakhri Yassin, was a corporate figure in Malaysia and assumed the position of Executive Chairman. The second child, Datin Sri Nabilah was involved in book writing and the third child, Najwa Mahiaddin and Farhan Yassin shared the same interest in the entertainment industry.

One of her grandchildren, Iman Alisha Datuk Fakhri Yassin was an athlete representing the Federal Territory in 2018 Sukma Games at Perak Darul Ridzuan at the age of 13. Her sister, Iman Suraya is also active in rhythmic gymnastics sports as well as her siblings, Iman Arissa and Iman Aleena. 

Tan Sri Abdul Rahim Mohamad and Puan Sri Hajjah Fadzilah Md Ariff are the parents of her son-in-law, Datin Fara Ikma. Mr. Berhan Manap and Mrs. Jamaliah Baba are the parents of her son-in-law, Dato' Sri Muhamad Adlan. Mr Koh Lai Poo and Mrs. Chiam Juat Wah are also the parents of her son-in-law, Idris Koh.

She was the daughter-in-law of the late Muslim scholar, Tuan Guru Muhammad Yasin bin Muhammad, a famous scholar in Muar from Tanjung Bidara, Melaka. Her mother-in-law is the late Hajjah Khadijah binti Haji Kassim, descended from Java.

School in-Hospital project
She is the Patron, the Internal Conscience Program of the School in-Hospital project. It was her inspiration to give students and students the opportunity to get an education when they were hospitalized. It is a collaboration between the Ministry of Education, the Ministry of Health and the Nurul Yaqeen Foundation.

Orchid hybrids
Malaysian Agricultural Research and Development Institute (MARDI) has produced two hybrid orchid breeds in conjunction with her name, Aranda Puan Sri Noorainee and Mokara Puan Sri Noorainee.

Community activities
 Vice-President, Charity and Welfare of Wives of the Federal Minister and Deputy Minister of Malaysia (BAKTI)
 The President, the Wife's Charity Agency of Johor State Legislative Assembly of Barisan Nasional (JUITA Johor)
 Patron, PUSPANITA
 Ministry of Home Affairs Malaysia
 Ministry of Education Malaysia
 Ministry of International Trade and Industry Malaysia
 Ministry of Agriculture and Agro-Based Industry of Malaysia
 Ministry of Domestic Trade and Consumer Affairs Malaysia
 Ministry of Youth and Sports Malaysia
 Patron, Conscience Program: In-Hospital School
 Patron, Malaysian Gymnastics Federation
 Patron, SPWinds, Sekolah Seri Puteri, Cyberjaya

Honours 
  :
  Knight Grand Commander of the Order of the Crown of Johor (SPMJ) – Datin Paduka (2013)
  :
  Grand Knight of the Order of Sultan Ahmad Shah of Pahang (SSAP) – Dato' Sri (2014)
  :
  Grand Commander of the Order of Kinabalu (SPDK) – Datuk Seri Panglima (2021).

Honorific titles

Wife of Deputy Prime Minister (2009-2015)
Yang Amat Berbahagia Puan Sri Datin Paduka Hajah Noorainee binti Haji Abdul Rahman

Wife of the Minister of Home Affairs (2018-2020)
Yang Berbahagia Puan Sri Datin Paduka Hajah Noorainee binti Haji Abdul Rahman

Wife of the Prime Minister (2020-2021)
Yang Amat Berbahagia Puan Sri Datin Paduka Hajah Noorainee binti Haji Abdul Rahman

Other titles

She is styled as Yang Berhormat Puan Sri Datin Paduka Hajah Noorainee binti Haji Abdul Rahman when she is not accompanying her husband at the state of Johor

She is styled as Yang Hormat Puan Sri Dato' Sri Hajah Noorainee binti Haji Abdul Rahman when she is not accompanying her husband at the state of Pahang

She is styled as Yang Berbahagia Puan Sri Datuk Seri Panglima Hajah Noorainee binti Haji Abdul Rahman when she is not accompanying her husband at the state of Sabah

See also 
 Spouse of the Prime Minister of Malaysia

References 

1952 births
Living people
People from Muar
People from Johor
Malaysian people of Malay descent
Malaysian Muslims
Spouses of prime ministers of Malaysia
Spouses of Deputy Prime Ministers of Malaysia
Knights Grand Commander of the Order of the Crown of Johor
Grand Commanders of the Order of Kinabalu